Natural Bridge is an American literary magazine, based at University of Missouri-St. Louis. It was established in 1999 and the first issue was published in Spring 1999. The magazine is published biannually and features articles on fiction, essays, and poetry. The editor-in-chief is John Dalton. Molly Harris is managing editor.

In 2020, Natural Bridge ceased print publication. Its last physical edition was issue number 43. It is now published online as a subdivision of fellow St Louis-based literary journal Boulevard. The magazine's reading series — previously an in-person event — also moved online May 2020.

Other anthologies 
Work that has appeared in Natural Bridge has been short-listed on numerous occasions for the Best American Short Stories, the O. Henry Award, and the Pushcart Prize.

Notable contributors 
Jacob M. Appel
Dwight Bitikofer
Todd Davis
Mary Ruth Donnelly
Rodger Kamenetz
Kirsti Sandy
Erin Wilson

Honors and awards
Andao Tian's story, "The Death of My Mad Uncle," which appeared in issue no. 16, was short-listed for the O. Henry Prize in 2008.
 Kent Annan's essay "A Drop of Water," which appeared in issue no. 14, honored with "Special Mention" by The Best American Essays in 2006.
Roger Hart's story, "Lubing," which appeared in issue no. 5, was short-listed for the Pushcart Prize in 2003.
Leslie Pietrzyk's story, "This Day with You," which appeared in issue no. 1, was short-listed for The Pushcart Prize 2001.
Brian Doyle's essay, "Notes on the Poem 'Ggfddfg' by Joseph Doyle," which appeared in issue no. 06, cited as "Notable Essay of 2001 in The Best American Essays.
Lela Nargi, "Into the Thar" and Kathlene Postma, "Becoming Foreign" were both honored as "Notable Travel Writing" in the Best American Travel Writing of 2001.

See also
List of literary magazines

References

External links
 

1999 establishments in Missouri
Biannual magazines published in the United States
Literary magazines published in the United States
Magazines established in 1999
Magazines published in St. Louis
University of Missouri–St. Louis